Notochoerus is an extinct genus of very large pigs from the subfamily Tetraconodontinae. Fossils have been found in Africa, notably Uganda and Ethiopia.

Description 
These pigs were likely derived from the genus Nyanzachoerus. Like other tetraconodontine pigs, the males had ornamental growths on their skulls, formed from enamel.

References 

Prehistoric Suidae
Miocene even-toed ungulates
Pliocene even-toed ungulates
Pliocene mammals of Africa
Miocene mammals of Africa
Fossil taxa described in 1925
Prehistoric even-toed ungulate genera